Bradley is an English surname derived from a place name meaning "broad wood" or "broad meadow" in Old English.

Like many English surnames Bradley can also be used as a given name and as such has become popular.

It is also an Anglicisation of the Irish name Ó Brolacháin (also O’Brallaghan) from County Tyrone in Northern Ireland. The family moved and spread to counties Londonderry, Donegal and Cork, and England.

Surname
Bradley is the surname of the following notable people:

 A. C. Bradley (Andrew Cecil Bradley, 1851–1935), English Shakespearean scholar
 A. C. Bradley (screenwriter), an American screenwriter
 Abraham Bradley Jr. (1767–1838), first Assistant Postmaster-General of the U.S.
 Amy Lynn Bradley (born 1974), an American woman who disappeared during a Caribbean cruise 
 Andrew M. Bradley (1906–1983), American accountant and public official 
 Archie Bradley (baseball) (born 1992), American baseball player
 Arthur Granville Bradley (1850–1943), English author
 Avery Bradley (born 1990), American basketball player
 Bill Bradley (born 1943), American basketball player, Rhodes scholar, and former US senator from New Jersey
 Bill Bradley (baseball) (1878–1954), American baseball player and manager
 Bob Bradley (disambiguation), several people
 Brian Bradley (disambiguation), several people
 Bruce Bradley (born 1947), American water polo player
 Celeste Bradley, American author of romance novels
 Charles Bradley (singer) (1948–2017), American R&B, funk, and soul singer
 Craig Bradley (born 1963), Australian rules footballer
 Dan Beach Bradley (1804–1873), American Protestant missionary to Siam
 Dana Bradley (died 1981), Canadian murder victim
 Daniel Bradley (politician) (1833–1908), New York politician
 Daniel Joseph Bradley (1928–2010), Irish physicist
 David W. Bradley, computer game designer and programmer
 Ed Bradley (1941–2006), American journalist
 Eduardo Bradley (1887–1951), Argentine aviator
 Eli Bradley (1883–1964), English footballer
 Elizabeth Bradley (disambiguation), several people
 Ella J. Bradley-Hughley (1889–1918), American operatic soprano soloist and choir director.
 Eoin Bradley (born 1983), Irish Gaelic footballer, plays for Derry
 Evelyne Bradley (1925–2013), American judge
 Evalie A. Bradley (born 1954), Anguillian politician
 F. H. Bradley (Francis Herbert Bradley, 1846–1924), British idealist philosopher
 Foghorn Bradley (George H. Bradley, 1855–1900), American baseball umpire
 Gene Bradley (born 1957), American football player
 George Bradley (disambiguation), several people
 Gerald A. Bradley (1927–2005), American businessman and politician
 Gwendolyn Bradley, American soprano
 Henry Bradley (disambiguation), several people
 Herbert Bradley (1887–1918), English footballer
 Hunter Bradley (American football) (born 1994), American football player
 Jackie Bradley Jr. (born 1990), American baseball player
 Ja'Marcus Bradley (born 1996), American football player
 James Bradley (disambiguation), several people
 Jean-Claude Bradley (died 2014), American open science chemist
 Jeb Bradley (Joseph E. Bradley, born 1952), New Hampshire politician
 Jessica "Jess" Bradley, the protégé/scapegoat of James Stillwell in the comic series The Boys
 Joe Bradley (disambiguation), several people
 John Bradley (disambiguation), several people
 Joseph Bradley (died 1671), English buccaneer
 Joseph P. Bradley (1813–1892), Associate Justice of the United States Supreme Court 1870–1892
 Joshua Bradley (born 1992), English YouTuber
 Karen Bradley (born 1970), British politician
 Keegan Bradley (born 1986), American golfer
 Kepler Bradley (born 1985), Australian rules footballer with Essendon Bombers and Fremantle Dockers
 Lewis R. Bradley (1805–1879), American politician, the second Governor of Nevada
 Lewis Bradley (1889–1918), English rugby union and rugby league footballer who played in the 1900s and 1910s
 Liam Bradley, Irish Gaelic football manager
 Loretta Bradley (born 1933), American psychologist
 Luther Bradley (disambiguation), several people
 Marion Zimmer Bradley (1930–1999), American science fiction author
 Martin Bradley (disambiguation), several people
 Matt Bradley (born 1978), Canadian professional hockey player
 Matt Bradley (American football) (born 1960), American football player
 Mick Bradley (1947–1972), British blues-rock drummer
 Milton Bradley (disambiguation), several people
 Nina Bradley (boxer) (born 1987), British boxer
 Omar Bradley (1893–1981), U.S. general
 Paddy Bradley (born 1981), Irish Gaelic footballer, plays for Derry
 Percy Bradley (1887–1967), English footballer
 Peter Bradley (disambiguation), several people
 Provine Bradley, (1907–1986), American Negro league baseball player
 Reginald Bradley (1873–1922), Canadian ice hockey player
 Robert Bradley (disambiguation), several people
 Ruth Bradley Holmes (1924–2021), American linguist, educator, and polyglot
 Ryan Bradley (born 1983), American figure skater
 Scott Bradley (baseball) (born 1960), American baseball player and coach
 Shaun Bradley (born 1997), American football player
 Shawn Bradley (born 1972), retired American basketball player
 Stephen Bradley (disambiguation), several people
 Steve Bradley (1975–2008), American professional wrestler 
 Stewart Bradley (born 1983), retired American football player
 Tom Bradley (disambiguation), several people named Thomas or Tom
 W. C. Bradley (William Clark Bradley, 1863–1947), American entrepreneur and Coca-Cola chairman
 Will H. Bradley (1868–1962), American Art Nouveau illustrator and artist
 William Bradley (disambiguation), several people
 Yasemin Bradley, Turkish female physician specialized as nutritionist and dietitian, also a television presenter and writer

First name
Bradley (sometimes shortened to Brad) is the first name of several notable people:
 Brad Ausmus (born 1969), American Major League Baseball all-star catcher
 Bradley Beattie (born 1957), former English footballer
 Bradley Bozeman (born 1994), American football player
 Bradley Chubb (born 1996), American football player
 Bradley Cooper (born 1975), American actor
 Brad Hogg (born 1970), Australian cricketer
 Bradley Hore (born 1981), Australian flyweight boxer
 Bradley James, English actor
 Bradley McGee (born 1976), former Australian professional cyclist (road and track)
 Bradley McIntosh (born 1981), member of S Club 7
 Bradley Mousley (born 1996), Australian tennis player
 Bradley Nowell (1968–1996), American musician
 Brad Pitt (born 1963), American actor
 Bradley Steven Perry (born 1998), American actor
 Bradley G. Pieper (born 1942), American businessman and politician
 Bradley Simpson (born 1995), British musician
 Bradley Quinn (born 1976), Northern Irish photographer
 Bradley Walsh (born 1960), English comedian and TV presenter
 Bradley Whitford (born 1959), American actor
 Bradley Wiggins (born 1980), British professional cyclist (road and track)
 Bradley was the given name of Chelsea Manning (born 1987), the American whistleblower/video leaker in Wikileaks' Collateral Murder case before she announced her gender transition

See also
 Bradly
 Bradlee

References

External links 
 

English given names
English-language surnames
English masculine given names